Raghunathpur Assembly constituency is an assembly constituency in Siwan district in the Indian state of Bihar.

Overview
As per Delimitation of Parliamentary and Assembly constituencies Order, 2008, No. 108 Raghunathpur Assembly constituency  is composed of the following: Raghunathpur  and Hussainganj community development blocks; Shekpura, Piyaur, Aranda, Gayghat and Usari Bujurg gram panchayats of Hasanpura CD Block.

Raghunathpur Assembly constituency is part of No. 18 Siwan (Lok Sabha constituency) .
Raghunathpur consists of village's like Rajpur, Kausar, Murarpatti, Mathia, Semaria, Narakatia, Khap banakat, Narhan, Adampur, Lagusa, Nikhti, Jhakhara etc.

Election results

2020

References

External links
 

Assembly constituencies of Bihar
Politics of Siwan district